Peter Ganine (October 11, 1900August 11, 1974) was a Georgian-Russian-American sculptor best known for his work in ceramics and his chess sets.

Ganine began his art studies in Russia. He spent five years as a trader in the Belgian Congo before coming to the US in 1931, on a scholarship to Corcoran Gallery of Art in Washington, D.C. He settled in Hollywood in 1932, where he lived until his death. His work was championed by longtime Los Angeles Times art editor and critic Arthur Millier.

He served as an aircraft patternmaker during World War II.

The subjects of Ganine's sculptures were largely people or animals. He patented many of his animal sculptures, which were then reproduced in plastic and sold inexpensively. His most popular designs were a whale, which won a prize from the Metropolitan Museum of Modern Art, and an "uncapsizeable duck", of which over 50,000,000 were sold. When Ganine gave human faces to chess pieces, he introduced "first major change of design for chess sets in more than a century."

Personal life 
Ganine married actress Marguerite Churchill on June 5, 1954. He later married a woman named Karin.

Works 
 Superba Gothic chess set (c.1930s)
 Colt sculpture (c.1939)
 Baby Centaur sculpture (c.1940)
 Beer Mug sculpture (c.1941)
 Rudolph sculpture of a dachshund (c.1941)
 Bull sculpture (c.1941)
 Dog sculpture (c.1944)
 Why sculpture (c.1944)
 Life Mask of Nicholai Fechin sculpture (1945)
 Happy Womanhood sculpture (c.1947) – model: Maureen O'Hara
 Hosanna sculpture of choir boys (c.1948)
 Classic chess set (1961) – the chess pieces from the Classic chess set were used in Star Trek as part of the tri-dimensional chess set
 Rearing Colt sculpture
 Portrait of Marguerite Churchill sculpture

Exhibitions 
 1938 – Group show at the California Art Club
 1939 – Golden Gate International Exposition
 1939 – The Fine Arts Gallery of San Diego
 1940 – National Ceramic Exhibition at Syracuse Museum of Fine Arts, where he won first prize in ceramic sculpture for Baby Centaur
 1942 – "Artist of the Month" for January, solo show at the Los Angeles County Museum
 1944 – Society for Sanity in Art's group show at Los Angeles County Museum
 1960 – Group show at W. & J. Sloane Petite Galerie in Beverly Hills

References 

1900 births
1974 deaths
20th-century American sculptors
20th-century American male artists
19th-century American sculptors
19th-century American male artists
American male sculptors
Soviet expatriates in the Belgian Congo
Soviet emigrants to the United States